The 1952 SFR Yugoslavia Chess Championship was the 8th edition of SFR Yugoslav Chess Championship. Held in Belgrade, SFR Yugoslavia, SR Serbia. The tournament was won by Petar Trifunović.

Table and results

References 

Yugoslav Chess Championships
1952 in chess
Chess